The 2022 Ohio gubernatorial election was held on November 8, 2022, to elect the governor of Ohio. Incumbent Republican Governor Mike DeWine won re-election to a second term in a landslide, defeating Democrat nominee Nan Whaley, the former mayor of Dayton, 62.4% to 37.4%. DeWine's 25-point victory marked the continuation of a trend in which every incumbent Republican Governor of Ohio since 1978 has won re-election by a double digit margin.

This was the first time since 1994 in which Trumbull and Mahoning counties have gone to the Republican candidate with over 60% of the vote.

Republican primary 

Incumbent Governor Mike DeWine faced backlash from Republicans due to having implemented strict COVID-19 restrictions, such as a statewide stay at home order and mask mandates. Due to this, on April 30, 2021, farmer Joe Blystone became the first candidate to announce a primary challenge to DeWine. On June 9, former U.S. Representative Jim Renacci also announced a run, later being followed up by former state representative Ron Hood. As a result, DeWine became the first incumbent Ohio governor to face a primary challenger since Jim Rhodes in 1978 and the first to have multiple challengers since Michael Disalle in 1962. Initial polling showed Renacci in the lead; however his lead soon evaporated, as DeWine attempted to appeal to conservatives angry with his COVID response by attacking President Joe Biden's policies and signing Constitutional carry into law, allowing permitless carry of firearms. Incumbent governors rarely ever lose their primaries. Ultimately, DeWine prevailed in the May 3rd primary election, however only won with a plurality of the vote, which suggests that he could have lost had his opponents not split the vote.

Candidates

Nominated 
Mike DeWine, incumbent Governor of Ohio (2019–present), 50th Attorney General of Ohio (2011–2019), former U.S. Senator from Ohio (1995–2007), 59th Lieutenant Governor of Ohio, and former U.S. Representative for Ohio's 7th congressional district (1983–1991)
 Running mate: Jon Husted, incumbent Lieutenant Governor (2019–present)

Eliminated in primary 
Joe Blystone, farmer
 Running mate: Jeremiah Workman, Iraq War veteran; Restaurateur Joanna Swallen, Blystone's original running mate, withdrew
Ron Hood, former state representative from the 78th district (2013–2020), 91st district (2005–2006), 57th district (1995–2000), and candidate for OH-15 in 2021
 Running mate: Candice Keller, former state representative from the 53rd district (2016–2020)
 Running mate: Joe Knopp, Christian film producer

Declined 
Jon Husted, Lieutenant Governor of Ohio (2019–present) (ran for re-election)
Josh Mandel, former Ohio State Treasurer (2011–2019), nominee for U.S. Senate in 2012, and candidate for U.S. Senate in 2018 (ran U.S. Senate)
Dave Yost, Attorney General of Ohio (2019–present) and former Ohio State Auditor (2011–2019) (ran for re-election)

Endorsements

Polling 
Graphical summary

Results

Democratic primary

Candidates

Nominated 
Nan Whaley, former Mayor of Dayton (2014–2022) and candidate in 2018
 Running mate: Cheryl Stephens, Cuyahoga County Council Vice President

Eliminated in primary 
John Cranley, former Mayor of Cincinnati (2013–2022) and nominee for OH-01 in 2000 and 2006
 Running mate: Teresa Fedor, State Senator from Ohio's 11th senatorial district

Withdrawn 
Ted Williams, voice-over artist

Declined 
Emilia Sykes, Minority Leader of the Ohio House of Representatives (2019–2021) and state representative (2015–2023) (ran for the U.S. House in Ohio's 13th congressional district)

Endorsements

Polling

Results

Independents

Candidates 
 Timothy Grady (write-in) 
 Running mate: Dayna Bickley
 Craig Patton (write-in) 
 Running mate: Collin Cook
 Renea Turner (write-in) 
 Running mate: Adina Pelletier
 Marshall Usher (write-in) 
 Running mate: Shannon Walker

Disqualified 
 F. Patrick Cunnane
 Running mate: Mary Cunnane
 Niel Petersen, pastor from Huber Heights
 Running mate: Michael V Stewart

Endorsements

General election

Predictions

Endorsements

Polling 
Aggregate polls

Graphical summary

Mike DeWine vs. John Cranley

Results 

According to a survey conducted by NORC for Fox News and the Associated Press, most white people (68% to 32%), Latinos (64% to 33%), and other minorities (60% to 36%) voted for DeWine, while most African Americans voted for Whaley (73% to 27%).

Results by county

See also 
 2022 Ohio elections

Notes 

Partisan clients

References

External links 
Official campaign websites
 Mike DeWine (R) for Governor
 Nan Whaley (D) for Governor
 Tim Grady (I) for Governor

2022
Ohio
Gubernatorial